Semirossia is a genus of bobtail squid comprising three species.

Species
Genus Semirossia
Semirossia equalis Voss, 1950, greater bobtail squid
Semirossia patagonica Smith, 1881
Semirossia tenera (Verrill, 1880), lesser bobtail squid

References

External links

Bobtail squid
Cephalopod genera